The 165th Massachusetts General Court, consisting of the Massachusetts Senate and the Massachusetts House of Representatives, met in 1967 and 1968 during the governorship of John Volpe. Maurice A. Donahue served as president of the Senate and Robert H. Quinn served as speaker of the House.

Senators

Representatives

See also
 90th United States Congress
 List of Massachusetts General Courts

References

Further reading

External links

 
 
 
 
  (1964-1994)

Political history of Massachusetts
Massachusetts legislative sessions
massachusetts
1967 in Massachusetts
massachusetts
1968 in Massachusetts